Semra Dündar (April 5, 1943 – April 7, 2005) was a Turkish hematologist.

Dündar was born in Lüleburgaz in 1943. She graduated from the Ankara University School of Medicine and spent nearly all of her career working at the Hacettepe University Hospital and School of Medicine in Ankara, Turkey, where she rose to become Professor of Hematology and head of the Hematology Department.  She worked on many hematologic diseases, including leukemias, anemias, and Behçet's syndrome.  She was also a visiting physician in Bristol, England, between 1975 and 1977.  She had over 125 publications on hematologic diseases in international medical journals, as well as being coauthor of many medical textbooks.

She died in Ankara on April 7, 2005, of complications from surgery.

Turkish hematologists
Turkish medical researchers
Turkish women academics
Ankara University alumni
Academic staff of Hacettepe University
2005 deaths
1943 births
People from Lüleburgaz